Gignoux may refer to:

Places 
 Pointe Maurice Gignoux (or Pointe de la Fournache), a mountain of Savoie, France

People 
 Anna Barbara Gignoux (1725-1796), German business person
 Claude-Joseph Gignoux (1890-1968), French politician
 Edward Thaxter Gignoux (1916–1988), United States federal judge
 Ernest Gignoux (1874–1955), American fencer 
 Françoise Gignoux (born 1923), French former alpine skier
 Maurice Gignoux (1881–1955), French geologist
 Pierre Gignoux (b. 1967), French ski mountaineer
 Régis François Gignoux (1816–1882), French painter active in the United States from 1840 to 1870

See also
 Gignous, a surname